Boronia stricta is a plant in the citrus family, Rutaceae and is endemic to near-coastal areas of the south-west of Western Australia. It is a slender shrub with often crowded pinnate leaves with linear leaflets, and pink, four-petalled flowers borne singly or in groups of two or three in leaf axils.

Description
The style is club-shaped. Flowering mainly occurs from September to December.

Taxonomy and naming
Boronia stricta was first formally described in 1845 by Friedrich Gottlieb Bartling and the description was published in Plantae Preissianae. The specific epithet (stricta) is a Latin word meaning "straight", "erect" or "rigid".

Distribution and habitat
Boronia stricta grows in swampy areas between Margaret River, the Stirling Ranges and Albany in the Esperance Plains, Jarrah Forest and Warren biogeographic regions.

Conservation
Boronia stricta is classified as "not threatened" by the Western Australian Government Department of Parks and Wildlife.

References

stricta
Flora of Western Australia
Plants described in 1845
Taxa named by Friedrich Gottlieb Bartling